The Fig Springs mission site (8CO1) is an archaeological site in Ichetucknee Springs State Park, in Columbia County, Florida. It has been identified as the site of a Spanish mission to the Timucua people of the region, dating to the first half of the 17th century. Found within the historical territory of the Timucua tribe known as the Northern Utina, it is thought to be the Mission San Martín de Timucua, also known as San Martín de Ayacuto, which was founded in the important Northern Utina village of Ayacuto in 1608.

Description
The Fig Springs site is adjacent to a short tributary connecting Fig Springs to the Ichetucknee River, about one mile downstream from the head springs of the Ichetucknee. An apparent midden was discovered in the tributary in 1949, and a survey with limited excavations in 1986 found evidence of a mission on the adjacent land, including a church building, missionary residence (convento), cemetery, plaza and native village. More extensive excavations were carried out in 1988-1989.

Analysis of sherds found at the site indicated that the mission was occupied during the first half of the 17th century. The archaeologists identified the site as likely to be that of San Martín de Timucua, which is known to have been founded in 1608, and which does not appear in Spanish records after the Timucua rebellion of 1656. An earlier identification of the site as Santa Catalina de Afuerica, which is known to have existed in the area between 1675 and 1685, is less likely based on the evidence of the sherds. The mission appears to have been established at one of the five major towns that existed at the beginning of the 17th century in the Province of Timucua proper (also Northern Utina or Utina), which included north Florida north of the Santa Fe River from the St. Johns River in the east to the Aucilla River in the west.

The mission church was an open-air structure, with a plank wall on the east end, and the other sides left open. Posts, about 10 cm square, supported a roof over an area about 10.5 m north-south and 8 m east-west. The floor had been cleared down to bare earth, and a clean sand subfloor supported a packed clay floor, which rose in steps from west to east. The structure apparently burned, and the remains were covered by a layer of clean sand. A cemetery on the north side of the church included several rows of burials. Unlike several other Spanish missions in Florida, no burials were found in the floor of the church.

References
Weisman, Brent R. 1993. "Archaeology of Fig Springs Mission, Ichetucknee Springs State Park", in Bonnie G. McEwan. ed. The Spanish Missions of La Florida. University Press of Florida.

Further reading

External links
 Comparative Mission Archaeology Portal - Fig Springs (Mission San Martín de Tmucua)

Archaeological sites in Florida
Spanish missions in Florida
Timucua
1608 establishments in the Spanish Empire